.dj is the country code top-level domain (ccTLD) for Djibouti.

The domain has also been marketed as a domain hack for music-related sites due to the common use of "DJ" to mean disc jockey, and a project is under development to encourage use for "Data Journals" as well.

See also 

 .am
 .cd
 .fm
 .me
 .mu

External links
IANA .dj whois information

Country code top-level domains
Communications in Djibouti

sv:Toppdomän#D